The Turbo EP is an EP released by Manchester band Sonic Boom Six in September 2003. The EP was their first release for Moon Ska Europe; they had self-released an EP the previous year. This was produced by Ace (of Skunk Anansie) and Christophe.

According to Barney Boom, it was limited to 1000 copies.

Track listing
Blood For Oil
People Acklike They Don't Know
The Devil Made Me Do It
Silent Majority

References

Sonic Boom Six albums
2003 EPs